The 9/11 Family Steering Committee was an organization of twelve relatives of victims of the September 11 attacks in 2001 against the World Trade Center. Members of the Committee included the Jersey Girls. It was part of the 9/11 Truth Movement and was set up to monitor the work of the 9/11 Commission.

History
The now-defunct group was an offshoot of the Coalition for an Independent 9/11 Commission, which advocated the creation of an independent commission to investigate the failures that made 9/11 possible. The coalition represented a wide array of 9/11 families' organizations, including Families of September 11, Sept. 11 Advocates (also known as "The Jersey Girls"), and Voices of September 11. Although the call for a commission was initially resisted by the Bush Administration, the coalition eventually prevailed in the creation of the 9/11 Commission.

The Washington Post stated:

Monitoring of the 9/11 Commission

However, the Family Steering Committee was unsatisfied with the commission created and its mandate.

They stated:

It further created a list of questions they argued was unanswered by the official commission.

On January 11, 2005, the committee made the following statement:

The group ceased operations on January 11, 2005. Some of the research and advocacy of members of the Family Steering Committee is featured in the documentary "9/11: Press for Truth" premiered September 2006.

Media coverage
PBS NOW
Scoop
From The Wilderness
Indymedia
The Washington Post
The Christian Science Monitor
CBS News
New York Daily News, written by the two members Kristen Breitweiser and Bill Harvey
CNN
The Washington Times
Peter Lance
The New York Times
The Washington Post
USA Today
Zogby poll
The Village Voice

Members
The member list include all the Jersey Girls

Notes

References
 The Family Steering Committee
 Fox news - Congress Fails to Pass Intelligence Overhaul
 Fox news - 9/11 Families Continue to Push Congress
 Fox news - 9/11 Families Urge Action
 Govexec.com - Groups call for the resignation of Sept. 11 commission director (03/22/2004) 
 Govexec.com - Sept. 11 families question Bush's role in terrorist attacks (02/20/2004) 
 Govexec.com - 9/11 families lobby Congress to act quickly on intelligence overhaul (10/14/2004) 
 Govexec.com - Bush, Cheney, Rice agree to meet with Sept. 11 panel (03/30/2004) 
 Govexec.com - Rice: Red tape hindered pre-9/11 efforts (04/08/2004) 
 Govexec.com - 9/11 commission scolds government over attacks, calls for major reforms (07/22/2004)  
 Govexec.com - House Government Reform chairman not among intelligence overhaul conferees (10/15/2004)  
 Govexec.com - Election Day deadline failing to motivate intelligence reform conferees (10/18/2004)  
 Govexec.com - Passage of intel bill may rest on speedy accord, aides say (11/15/2004) 
 Families of 9/11 are 'the rock stars of grief' says sister of Pentagon pilot

Groups challenging the official accounts of the September 11 attacks
Organizations established in 2001
2005 disestablishments in the United States
Family Steering Committee
2001 establishments in the United States